6 in 1 may refer to:

The hexavalent vaccine (6-in-1)
Caltron 6 in 1, NES multicart
"Six in One", a 1944 patrol by the HMS Kite (U87)
"Six in One", jazz piece by Thelonious Monk